Olga Boric-Lubecke from the University of Hawaii at Manoa, Honolulu was named Fellow of the Institute of Electrical and Electronics Engineers (IEEE) in 2015 for contributions to biomedical microwave technology. She co-founded Adnoviv a startup working with sensor technology founded in 2013.

Education
Ph.D. degree from the University of California, Los Angeles, in 1995, all in electrical engineering.

References 

University of Hawaiʻi faculty
California Institute of Technology alumni
American engineers
Serbian women engineers
Living people

Year of birth missing (living people)